The Green Satchel Classic (Chinese: t , s , p Qīngnángjīng) was a late-9th-century AD work attributed to the Tang writer Yang Yunsong. With the loss of the original Classic of Burial, it is one of the few surviving "classic" texts concerning the principles guiding the Chinese practice of fengshui.

It is also known as the Esoteric Pronouncements of the Green Satchel (t , s , p Qīngnáng'àoyǔ).

References

9th-century books